Nights of Princes (French: Nuits de princes) is a 1930 French drama film directed by Marcel L'Herbier and starring Gina Manès, Jaque Catelain and Harry Nestor. It is an adaptation of the 1927 novel of the same title by Joseph Kessel. The story was remade as a 1938 film directed by Vladimir Strizhevsky.

It was shot at the Billancourt Studios in Paris. The film's sets were designed by the art directors Serge Piménoff and Pierre Schild.

Plot
A White Russian woman working as a dancer in a Paris nightclub finds her past returning to haunt her when her husband, an engineer long believed dead in the Russian Civil War, reappears to seek her help.

Cast
Gina Manès as Helene Vronsky
Jaque Catelain as Prince Vassia Heridze
Harry Nestor as Prince Fedor Achkeliani 
Alice Tissot as Mlle. Mesureux
Dimitri Dimitriev as Anton Irtych 
Alexandre Mihalesco as Stéphane
Walia Ostermann as Nathalia Vronsky 
Jean Toulout as Admiral Alexeieff
Nathalie Lissenko as Vera Petrovna
Kinny Dorlay as young gypsy
Alex Bernard as Dr. Alexei Barkoff
André de Schack as Prince Michel Rizine
G. Clein as Dr. Chouvaloff
Behrs as Prince Heridze

References

External links

Films directed by Marcel L'Herbier
Films shot at Billancourt Studios
Films based on French novels
1930 drama films
French drama films
Films set in Paris
1930s French-language films
1930s French films